Xiang of Qi may refer to:

Duke Xiang of Qi (died 686 BC)
King Xiang of Qi (died 265 BC)